This is a list of American films released in 1972.

Cabaret won 8 Academy Awards including Best Director and Best Actress. The Godfather won the Academy Award for Best Picture.



A–C

D–G

H–M

N–S

T–Z

See also
 1972 in the United States

External links

 1972 films at the Internet Movie Database
 List of 1972 box office number-one films in the United States

1972
Films
Lists of 1972 films by country or language